The Nationalist Valencian Party (in Valencian: Partit Valencià Nacionalista, PVN) was a political party created in 1990 as an offshoot of the Valencian People's Union.

Ideology
The party defined itself as progressive, inter-classist and centrist. The party was more moderate than the Valencian People's Union, both in its national and social ideas. While the PVN came from the pro-Catalan tradition of valencianism, it rejected the Catalan Countries as a political project.

References

 Català i Oltra, Ll. (2012). Fonaments de la identitat territorial amb especial atenció a la identitat nacional. El cas valencià: discursos polítics sobre la identitat valenciana entre els militants de base del Bloc, EUPV i PSPV-PSOE. Universitat d'Alacant.
 Sanchis i Llàcer, V. (2012). Valencians, encara. Cinquanta anys després de Joan Fuster. Proa. .
 Flor i Moreno, V. (2000). Breu analysis dels valencians politics actuals. València: Joventut Valencianista. pp. 27–28.
 Hervàs, X. (2008). D'UPV al BLOC: el llarg camí del nacionalisme valencià. Lluc: revista de cultura i d'idees. pp. 3–6.

Political parties in the Valencian Community
Valencian nationalism